David Woods (born 10 March 1970) is an Australian former professional rugby league footballer who played in the 1980s, 1990s and 2000s. He played at representative level for Country New South Wales, and at club level for the Parramatta Eels (Heritage № 473), Wakefield Trinity (Heritage № 1044), the Penrith Panthers (Heritage № 396) and Halifax (Heritage № 1160).

Playing career
Woods began his career with Parramatta in 1989, making his first grade debut against Manly-Warringah.  Woods played for Parramatta at a time when most of the club's star players had retired or were coming towards the end of their careers.  In 1993, Woods joined Wakefield in England and played there during the off season before returning to Parramatta.  In 1997, Woods only made 5 appearances for The Eels and left at the end of the season.  He was later made a life member at the club.  In 1998, Woods joined Penrith and spent 4 years at the club before leaving and returning to England once again to play for Halifax.  Woods spent one season with Halifax before retiring from rugby league at the end of 2002.

References

1970 births
Living people
Australian rugby league players
Country New South Wales Origin rugby league team players
Rugby league fullbacks
Rugby league wingers
Rugby league centres
Rugby league five-eighths
Place of birth missing (living people)
Parramatta Eels players
Penrith Panthers players
Wakefield Trinity players